FC Epitsentr Kamianets-Podilskyi is a professional Ukrainian football club from the city of Kamianets-Podilskyi. The club's name "Epitsentr" is after the Ukrainian brand of home improvement wholesale stores Epitsentr K. Beside association football, the Dunaivtsi club also fields its professional futsal team Verest.

The team is currently playing Ukrainian First League after being promoted in 2022. The same year the Epitsentr officially moved from Dunaivtsi to Kamianets-Podilskyi. The club was formed back in 1960 as Kolhospnyk Dunaivtsi, part of the Kolos sports society.

History
The team was founded in 1960.

Epitsentr received professional status and debuted in the Ukrainian Second League in the 2020–21 season.

Former names
 1960–1991 Kolhospnyk Dunaivtsi
 1991–1992 Tekstylnyk Dunaivtsi
 1992–1993 Ternava Dunaivtsi
 1993–2006 Nyva-Tekstylnyk (Kolos-Tekstylnyk)
 2007–2008 INAPiK Dunaivtsi
 2009–2013 Verest-INAPiK Dunaivtsi
 2014–2018 Dunaivtsi
 2019–2022 Epitsentr Dunaivtsi
 2022– Epitsentr Kamianets-Podilskyi

Current squad
As of 25 August 2022

League and cup history

{|class="wikitable"
|-bgcolor="#efefef"
! Season
! Div.
! Pos.
! Pl.
! W
! D
! L
! GS
! GA
! P
!Domestic Cup
!colspan=2|Europe
!Notes
|-bgcolor=SteelBlue
|align=center rowspan=2|2019–20
|align=center rowspan=2|4th "1"
|align=center bgcolor=silver rowspan=2|2
|align=center rowspan=2|18
|align=center rowspan=2|12
|align=center rowspan=2|3
|align=center rowspan=2|3
|align=center rowspan=2|36
|align=center rowspan=2|20
|align=center rowspan=2|39
|align=center rowspan=2|
|align=center rowspan=2|
|align=center rowspan=2|
|align=center bgcolor=silver|Play-offs – Runner-up
|-bgcolor=SteelBlue
|align=center bgcolor=lightgreen|Admitted to SL
|-bgcolor=PowderBlue
|align=center|2020–21
|align=center|3rd "A"
|align=center|
|align=center|	
|align=center|	 	
|align=center|		
|align=center|
|align=center|	 	 	
|align=center|	
|align=center|
|align=center| finals
|align=center|
|align=center|
|align=center|
|}

Managers
 1993—2006 Volodymyr Monastyrskyi
 2007—2009 Mykola Kulyk
 2009—2015 Serhiy Ihnatyev
 2015–2019 Volodymyr Ihnatyev
 2019–2021 Ihor Badlo
 2021–present Oleh Naduda

References

External links
 Profile at AAFU

 
Ukrainian First League clubs
Football clubs in Khmelnytskyi Oblast
1960 establishments in Ukraine
Association football clubs established in 1960
Futsal clubs in Ukraine
Sport in Dunaivtsi
Sport in Kamianets-Podilskyi
Agrarian association football clubs in Ukraine